Zarah Sultana (born 31 October 1993) is a British Labour Party politician. She has been the Member of Parliament (MP) for Coventry South since the 2019 general election. A supporter of former Labour leader Jeremy Corbyn, she is on the left-wing of the Labour Party and the Chairperson of the Socialist Campaign Group parliamentary caucus.

Early life and education
Sultana was born in October 1993 in the West Midlands, and raised in Lozells, a working-class area of Birmingham, with three sisters. She is a Muslim and is of Pakistani ancestry: her grandfather migrated from Thub in Dadyal, Kashmir to Birmingham in the 1960s.

She attended Holte School, a non-selective community school, before studying at King Edward VI Handsworth Grammar School for sixth form. She then went on to study International Relations and Economics at the University of Birmingham.

She joined the Labour Party in 2011, whilst studying for her A-levels, following the coalition government's decision to treble university tuition fees to £9,000. Whilst at university, Sultana was elected to the National Executive Council of both Young Labour and the National Union of Students.

Parliamentary career

Sultana was listed fifth of seven among the Labour candidates for the 2019 European Parliament elections in the West Midlands constituency, meaning that she would be elected if Labour received enough votes in the region to appoint five MEPs. She was not elected, as Labour won only one MEP in the constituency.

In October 2019, she was selected as the Labour candidate for Coventry South, after the incumbent Labour MP Jim Cunningham announced that he would stand down. Her campaign was backed by Unite the Union, Momentum, the Fire Brigades Union, the Communication Workers Union and the Bakers, Food and Allied Workers' Union. However, her selection was opposed by some local Constituency Labour Party (CLP) members, who preferred local candidates; one member would tell Jewish News in 2021 that the CLP was "remarkably moderate" in comparison to Sultana. Sultana was elected at the 2019 general election, with a majority of 401 votes.

During the 2019 election campaign, The Jewish Chronicle reported that in 2015, whilst she was a student, Sultana made social media posts from a subsequently deleted account which implied that she would celebrate the deaths of the former Labour prime minister Tony Blair, Israeli prime minister Benjamin Netanyahu and former US President George W. Bush and she supported "violent resistance" by Palestinians. As a teenager, Sultana sent tweets telling someone whom she described as pro-Israel to "jump off a cliff" and compared the Holocaust to those who died in Iraq, Afghanistan, Palestine and Chechnya. In tweets, Sultana said her mother was displeased when she discovered her father was Jewish, and Sultana used slang phrases for white people—"YT" and "the white woman"—to describe some Jewish people. Sultana apologised for the posts and stated that she no longer held those views and "wrote them out of frustration rather than any malice". The Labour Party re-interviewed her as a consequence of the posts, but she remained the party's candidate. After her election, The Jewish Chronicle reported on a further social media post made by Sultana in 2015, in which she stated that students supporting Zionism were "advocating a racist ideology...and champion[ing] a state created through ethnic cleansing, sustained through occupation, apartheid and war crimes."

In her maiden speech, she decried "40 years of Thatcherism", criticised the effects of austerity, and voiced her support for a Green New Deal to combat climate change. She joined the left-wing Socialist Campaign Group shortly after being elected and in the 2020 Labour Party leadership election, nominated Rebecca Long-Bailey for leader and Richard Burgon for deputy leader. Neither was elected.

In January 2020, Sultana was appointed as Parliamentary Private Secretary to Dan Carden, the Shadow Secretary of State for International Development. She was removed from this role by Keir Starmer when he became leader in April 2020.

In December 2020, UNICEF announced that it would provide £25,000 to the charity School Food Matters so that vulnerable children and families in Southwark could be supplied with thousands of breakfast boxes over the Christmas school holidays. In parliament Sultana said that it was the first time UNICEF had been required to "feed working-class kids in the UK. But while children go hungry, a wealthy few enjoy obscene riches". She mentioned that Jacob Rees-Mogg is "reportedly in line to receive an £800,000 dividend payout this year". Rees-Mogg criticised UNICEF's action and called it "a political stunt of the lowest order". Sultana then sent Rees-Mogg a copy of Charles Dickens' A Christmas Carol, writing inside "Jacob, it seems this wasn't on Eton's reading list. Merry Christmas, Zarah".

In January 2021, Sultana called for prisoners to be prioritised for COVID-19 vaccinations, describing them as "a high risk setting for transmission" and as such, it would be a "humane approach to a completely disenfranchised population".

In April 2021, Sultana was profiled by Marie Le Conte for Vogue magazine, along with her Labour colleagues Charlotte Nichols, Taiwo Owatemi, and Sarah Owen. She spoke about the abuse she receives as a Muslim and as a woman of colour, including death threats and being told to 'go back to her own country'. Sultana was described as "one of the most left-wing new Labour MPs" who had "made a name for herself as an outspoken critic of the Government".

In May 2021, alongside celebrities and other public figures, Sultana was a signatory to an open letter from Stylist magazine which called on the government to address what it described as an "epidemic of male violence" by funding an "ongoing, high-profile, expert-informed awareness campaign on men's violence against women and girls".

On 24 February 2022, following the 2022 Russian invasion of Ukraine, Sultana was one of 11 Labour MPs threatened with losing the party whip after they signed a statement by the Stop the War Coalition which questioned the legitimacy of NATO and accused the alliance of "eastward expansion". All 11 MPs subsequently removed their signatures. After receiving a death threat, she criticised what she described as "inaccurate" reports by the media for creating "an active danger to the safety of public figures, and threaten[ing] to narrow our democracy". In a statement to The Guardian she said that she "unequivocally condemned" the actions of the Russian government in Ukraine. She also criticised an anonymous Labour source who described the 11 MPs as a "mouthpiece for the Kremlin" and said that she had complained to party chair Anneliese Dodds about party sources disseminating "dangerous and irresponsible messages".

In October 2022 Sultana was reselected as the Labour Party MP for her constituency after receiving 90% of the vote from six local branches of the party and support from all participating affiliate organisations.

References

External links

 

1993 births
Living people
21st-century British women politicians
Alumni of the University of Birmingham
British politicians of Pakistani descent
English Muslims
English people of Azad Kashmiri descent
English socialists
Female members of the Parliament of the United Kingdom for English constituencies
Labour Party (UK) MPs for English constituencies
Members of Parliament for Coventry
Muslim socialists
People educated at King Edward VI Handsworth
People from Birmingham, West Midlands
UK MPs 2019–present